Fram Stadion is a football stadium in Larvik, Norway. It is used by IF Fram Larvik.

References 

Larvik
Football venues in Norway
Sport in Vestfold og Telemark